The following is an alphabetical list of members of the United States House of Representatives from the state of Washington.  For chronological tables of members of both houses of the United States Congress from the state (through the present day), see United States congressional delegations from Washington.  The list of names should be complete (as of January 3, 2019), but other data may be incomplete. It includes members who have represented both the state and the territory, both past and present.

Current members 
Updated January 2023.
 : Suzan DelBene (D) (since 2012)
 : Rick Larsen (D) (since 2001)
 : Marie Gluesenkamp Perez (D) (since 2023)
 : Dan Newhouse (R) (since 2015)
 : Cathy McMorris Rodgers (R) (since 2005)
 : Derek Kilmer (D) (since 2013)
 : Pramila Jayapal (D) (since 2017)
 : Kim Schrier (D) (since 2019)
 : Adam Smith (D) (since 1997)
 : Marilyn Strickland (D) (since 2021)

List of members

See also

List of United States senators from Washington
United States congressional delegations from Washington
Washington's congressional districts

References 

Washington
United States representatives